Aurélie Revillet (born February 13, 1986) is a French skier and soldier.

Revillet represented France in the 2010 Winter Olympics, in the Alpine skiing events. She also took part in the FIS Alpine World Ski Championships 2009.

Results
FIS Alpine World Ski Championships 2009:Super-G–242010 Winter Olympics:Downhill–17

References

External links

 
 
 
 

1986 births
Living people
Alpine skiers at the 2010 Winter Olympics
French female alpine skiers
Olympic alpine skiers of France
Sportspeople from Savoie